I'm the One... Nobody Else is the title of the second studio album by actress Brigitte Nielsen.  It was released in 1992, and was produced by Christian De Walden (Thomas Anders). 
My Girl (My Guy) and How Could You Let Me Go were released as singles.
The album was re-released by Edel Music in August 2008 under the title Brigitte Nielsen.

Track listing

My Girl (My Guy) (duet with Jesse James)
I've Got The Best Man 
How Could You Let Me Go 
Give Me A Chance 
If You Stay 
On The Move 
The Dream 
The World Got In Between 
Nothing Ventured 
Who Told You 
Casanova Baby

Personnel 

 Produced and arranged by: Christian De Walden and Max Di Carlo
 Engineered and Mixed by: Walter Clissen at Flamingo Café Recording Studio, Los Angeles
 Digitally mastered by: Brian Gardner at Bernie Grundman Mastering, Hollywood
 Photos: Sebastian Copeland

Musicians 

 Synclavier programming: Ralf Stemmann
 Keyboards and Synthesizers: Ralf Stemmann and Max Di Carlo
 Acoustic piano: Larry Steelman 
 Guitars: Tim Pierce and Max Di Carlo
 Bass: Bob Parr
 Sax and Flute solo: Doug Norwine
 Horns: "The Heart Attack" Bill Bergman, Greg Smith, Roy Wiegand, Greg Smith and Nick Lane
 Percussion: Paulinho Da Costa
 Background vocals arrangements: Christian De Walden
 Background vocals: Bambi Jones, Brandy Jones, Daniel O'Brien, Max Di Carlo, Christian De Walden

See also 
Thomas Anders – Down on Sunset (1992)

References
Discogs.com

1992 albums